The Fort Tejon Historical Association (FTHA) is a historical society dedicated to preserving the historic site at Fort Tejon State Historic Park, in Kern County, California, and educating the public about the fort’s role in 19th century California and U.S. history.

Fort Tejon was established in 1854 at Tejon Pass, in the canyon between the San Emigdio Mountains and Tehachapi Mountains.  It is located near present-day Gorman on Interstate 5 in California.

The FTHA is well known for its annual Civil War reenactments that take place in June.

Organization
The Association was incorporated as a non-profit organization on August 1, 1983. As of 2019, it had approximately 70 members.

The FTHA is governed by a board of directors of six people.  Current officers are as follows.

See also
Fort Tejon
American Civil War reenactment
Mountain Communities of the Tejon Pass

External links
 Official Fort Tejon Historical Association website

Historical societies in California
History of Kern County, California
Historical reenactment groups
American Civil War reenactment
Mountain Communities of the Tejon Pass
1983 establishments in California
Organizations established in 1983